Nafoxidine (developmental code names U-11,000A) or nafoxidine hydrochloride is a nonsteroidal selective estrogen receptor modulator (SERM) or partial antiestrogen of the triphenylethylene group that was developed for the treatment of advanced breast cancer by Upjohn in the 1970s but was never marketed. It was developed at around the same time as tamoxifen and clomifene, which are also triphenylethylene derivatives. The drug was originally synthesized by the fertility control program at Upjohn as a postcoital contraceptive, but was subsequently repurposed for the treatment of breast cancer. Nafoxidine was assessed in clinical trials in the treatment of breast cancer and was found to be effective. However, it produced side effects including ichthyosis, partial hair loss, and phototoxicity of the skin in almost all patients, and this resulted in the discontinuation of its development.

Nafoxidine is a long-acting estrogen receptor ligand, with a nuclear retention in the range of 24 to 48 hours or more.

References

Abandoned drugs
Hormonal antineoplastic drugs
Phenol ethers
Pyrrolidines
Selective estrogen receptor modulators
Triphenylethylenes